Stuart F. Meyer (October 23, 1933 - May 21, 2001) was a Major League Baseball executive. He served as president of the St. Louis Cardinals from 1992 to 1994. He has also worked for the Anheuser-Busch from 1959 to 1995. Meyer was a graduate of Saint Louis University.

References

External links

1933 births
2001 deaths
St. Louis Cardinals executives
Major League Baseball team presidents
Saint Louis University alumni